Fudij (also Romanized as Fūdīj) is a village in Banestan Rural District, in the Central District of Behabad County, Yazd Province, Iran. At the 2006 census, its population was 21, in 12 families.

References 

Populated places in Behabad County